Oskar Begas (31 July 1828 in Berlin – 10 November 1883 in Berlin) was a German portrait and history painter.

Life and career 
He took his first lessons from his father, the well-known painter Carl Joseph Begas, and began by doing portraits of his family. He was soon collaborating on works with his father and, at the age of thirteen, received his first commission. Later, at the Prussian Academy of Arts, he specialized in history painting. From 1849 to 1850, he studied at the Dresden Academy of Fine Arts under Eduard Bendemann. He lived in Italy on a scholarship for two years, from 1852 to 1854.

He returned to Berlin after his father's death, completing an unfinished series of portraits depicting Knights who had received the Pour le Mérite. Afterwards, he received many of his own commissions from King Friedrich Wilhelm IV, producing portraits of Heinrich Friedrich Link, August Böckh, Johannes von Müller and Johann Lukas Schönlein, among others. In 1866, he was named a Professor at the Academy, remaining in demand and exhibiting widely. Toward the end of his life, he concentrated on landscapes. Since his death, his style has come to be considered rather formulaic.

He also did some decorative work, including lunettes in the Rotes Rathaus and small murals in the ballroom of the Kaisergallerie (a sort of early shopping mall) on Unter den Linden. Little of these remains, however. A detailed diary he kept from 1843 to 1848 has been of great use to cultural historians. The three-volume manuscript is in the collection of the Stiftung Stadtmuseum Berlin.

His brother Adalbert was also a painter. His brothers Karl and Reinhold were both sculptors.

References

Further reading 
 Irmgard Wirth: Berliner Malerei im 19. Jahrhundert. Siedler Verlag, Berlin 1990, S. 328.
 Stadtmuseum Berlin/Berlin-Museum/Märkisches Museum: Gemälde I,1: 16.-19. Jahrhundert. Verzeichnis der Bestände des künftigen Stadtmuseum Berlin. Mit einem kritischen Katalog der Gemälde des Berlin Museums, edited by Sabine Beneke and Sybille Gramlich, Berlin 1994.

External links 

1828 births
1883 deaths
Portrait painters
Prussian Academy of Arts alumni
19th-century German painters
19th-century German male artists
German male painters
German people of Belgian descent